NutRageous is a chocolate bar made by The Hershey Company. It consists of Reese's Peanut Butter topped with roasted peanuts and caramel covered in chocolate-flavored coating.

Overview
Developed as a candy bar loosely based on the Reese's Peanut Butter Cup, NutRageous was first sold in 1994.  NutRageous was originally called Acclaim, but this name was changed just prior to its release due to focus groups (mainly of children) responding more to the "NutRageous" branding. In 2014, "NutRageous" was rebranded as "Nut Bar" internationally and the weight of the bar was reduced from 51 g to 47 g.

Product variation
In May 2018, Hershey's released "Reese's Outrageous"; a variation of NutRageous which substitutes Reese's Pieces for the roasted peanuts.

Ingredients

One Nutrageous bar contains approximately 240 calories. Although Nutrageous candy bars do not contain gluten ingredients, they are not certified as gluten-free.

See also
 List of peanut dishes

References

External links
 

Chocolate bars
Peanut dishes
The Hershey Company brands
Products introduced in 1994
Brand name confectionery